Karl Brenton Jamie Kippenberger (born 26 August 1973 in Wellington, New Zealand), grandson of Captain E.T Kippenberger, great nephew of Major-General Sir Howard Kippenberger, is the bass guitarist of the New Zealand band Shihad.

Kippenberger grew up in Pukerua Bay just north of Wellington and attended Kapiti College (formerly Raumati District High School). Kapiti College is also the same high school that produced film director Peter Jackson, former All Black Christian Cullen as well as several other well-known Kiwi musicians, including Ara Adams Tamata of Katchafire and Danny Rodda.

After his 6th Form (year 12) year he left to attend Aotea College for his final high school year.

Awards and nomination

Aotearoa Music Awards
The Aotearoa Music Awards (previously known as New Zealand Music Awards (NZMA)) are an annual awards night celebrating excellence in New Zealand music and have been presented annually since 1965.

! 
|-
| 1997 || Karl Kippenberger & Jon Toogood for Shihad || Album Cover of the Year ||  ||rowspan="2"| 
|-
| 2000 || Karl Kippenberger for The General Electric || Album Cover of the Year||  
|-
| 2010 || Karl Kippenberger (as part of Shihad) || New Zealand Music Hall of Fame ||  || 
|-

References 

1973 births
Living people
Musicians from Wellington
New Zealand songwriters
Male songwriters
New Zealand guitarists
Male bass guitarists
People from Wellington City
People educated at Kapiti College
21st-century bass guitarists
21st-century male musicians
Shihad members
New Zealand male guitarists